The UNION of European Practitioners in Intellectual Property, or UNION-IP, is a European association of practitioners in the field of intellectual property. It was founded in 1961 under the name was "UNION of European Patent Attorneys".

See also 
 Intellectual property organization

Notes

External links

Intellectual property organizations
Organizations established in 1961